"King of Kings" is a contemporary worship song by Hillsong Worship and is the lead single from their twenty-eighth album, Awake. Released on 12 July 2019, it was written by Brooke Ligertwood, Scott Ligertwood, and Jason Ingram and produced by Michael Guy Chislett and Brooke Ligertwood.

Background 
Speaking with Worship Together, Scott Ligertwood shared that "King of Kings" was written when they met in Nashville, Tennessee. Ingram wrote the melody and Brooke Ligertwood wrote the lyrics, which focus on the gospel and the birth of the early church.

About the song, Brooke Ligertwood said:The Gospel is a now reality that requires a now response. It should never be treated or viewed as a relic - no matter how reverently one might err in that direction. With origins before time and echoes beyond it, it stands at the intersection of eternity and our every-day present and beckons, urges, demands us to look. Look at the Christ, the Son of God - bloodied for your sin and the sin of all humanity - repent and believe and take your place in the story of all stories - the story of the King of Kings.

Composition 
"King of Kings" is composed in the key of D major. The song has a tempo of 68 BPM, with a time signature of 4/4.

Music videos 
The lyric video for "King of Kings" was published the same day the song was released (12 July), and the live music video, recorded during the 2019 Hillsong Conference, premiered on 5 August; both videos were published on YouTube. On 27 February 2020, the Spanish lyric video for the song was released, titled "Rey De Reyes". On 3 August 2020, a video showing Brooke Ligertwood singing the song at Passion 2020 was published.

Awards and nominations

Charts

Weekly charts

Year-end charts

References 

2019 singles
Hillsong Worship songs
2019 songs
Songs written by Jason Ingram
Songs written by Brooke Fraser